The 2019 IIHF Women's World Championship Division I was two international ice hockey tournaments organised by the International Ice Hockey Federation. The Division I Group A tournament was played in Budapest, Hungary, from 7 to 13 April 2019, and the Division I Group B tournament was played in Beijing, China, from 6 to 12 April 2019.

Hungary and Denmark earned promotion to the Top Division in Division I Group A, while the Netherlands gained promotion after their Division I Group B victory. Italy and Latvia got relegated by finishing last in their respective group.

Division I Group A

Participants

Match officials
4 referees and 7 linesmen were selected for the tournament.

Final standings

Results
All times are local (UTC+2).

Awards and statistics

Awards
Best players selected by the directorate:
Best Goalkeeper:  Ena Nystrøm
Best Defenseman:  Charlotte Wittich
Best Forward:  Fanni Gasparics
Source: IIHF.com

Scoring leaders
List shows the top skaters sorted by points, then goals.

GP = Games played; G = Goals; A = Assists; Pts = Points; +/− = Plus/minus; PIM = Penalties in minutes; POS = Position
Source: IIHF.com

Leading goaltenders
Only the top five goaltenders, based on save percentage, who have played at least 40% of their team's minutes, are included in this list.

TOI = Time on ice (minutes:seconds); SA = Shots against; GA = Goals against; GAA = Goals against average; Sv% = Save percentage; SO = Shutouts
Source: IIHF.com

Division I Group B

Participants

Match officials
4 referees and 7 linesmen were selected for the tournament.

Final standings

Results
All times are local (UTC+8).

Awards and statistics

Awards
Best players selected by the directorate:
Best Goalkeeper:  Kristiāna Apsīte
Best Defenseman:  Park Chae-lin
Best Forward:  Savine Wielenga
Source: IIHF.com

Media All-Stars:
 MVP:  Fang Xin
Source: IIHF.com

Scoring leaders
List shows the top skaters sorted by points, then goals.

GP = Games played; G = Goals; A = Assists; Pts = Points; +/− = Plus/minus; PIM = Penalties in minutes; POS = Position
Source: IIHF.com

Leading goaltenders
Only the top five goaltenders, based on save percentage, who have played at least 40% of their team's minutes, are included in this list.

TOI = Time on ice (minutes:seconds); SA = Shots against; GA = Goals against; GAA = Goals against average; Sv% = Save percentage; SO = Shutouts
Source: IIHF.com

References

External links
Official website of IIHF

2019
Division I
2019 IIHF World Championship Division I
2019 IIHF World Championship Division I
International sports competitions in Budapest
Sports competitions in Beijing
2019 in Hungarian sport
2019 in Chinese sport
IIHF
IIHF